Russian hamster may refer to:
Campbell's Russian dwarf hamster (Phodopus campbelli)
the Russian winter white dwarf hamster (Phodopus sungorus)